Josh Lacey (born 1968 in London) is a British writer. He has written several children’s books and one book for adults, God is Brazilian, a biography of Charles Miller, the man who introduced football to Brazil.

Bibliography

For Children

Mistifz 

The One That Got Away (2009)
Two Tigers on a String (2009)
Three Diamonds and a Donkey (2010)

Bug Club 

 The Mystery of the Poisoned Pudding (2011)
 The Mystery of the Missing Finger (2011)

Tom Trelawney 

 The Island Of Thieves (2011)
 The Sultan's Tigers (2013)

Dragonsitter 

 The Dragonsitter (2012)
 The Dragonsitter Takes Off (2013)
 The Dragonsitter's Castle (2013)
 The Dragonsitter's Island (2014)
 The Dragonsitter's Party (2015)
 The Dragonsitter to the Rescue (2016)
 The Dragonsitter: Trick or Treat? (2016)

Hope Jones 

 Hope Jones Saves the World (2020)
 Hope Jones Will Not Eat Meat (2021)

Others 

Bearkeeper (2008)
 The Robbers (2009)
 The Pet Potato, illustrated by Momoko Abe (2022)

Grk 
Written under the pseudonym Joshua Doder

 A Dog Called Grk (2005)
 Grk and the Pelotti Gang (2006)
 Grk and the Hot Dog Trail (2006)
 Grk: Operation Tortoise (2007)
 Grk Smells a Rat (2008)
 Grk Takes Revenge (2009)
 Grk Down Under (2010)
 Grk and the Phoney Macaroni (2012)

For Adults 

 God is Brazilian: Charles Miller, the Man Who Brought Football to Brazil (2005)

References

External links
 Official Author Site

1968 births
Living people
British children's writers
Writers from London
English male writers